{{Infobox writer
| image = 6.30.13AlayaJohnsonByLuigiNovi1.jpg
| imagesize = 
| name = Alaya Dawn Johnson
| caption = Johnson in 2013
| birth_date = 
| birth_place = Washington DC
| occupation = Writer
| period = 2007–present
| genre = Science fiction, fantasy, Solarpunk
| subject = 
| spouse = 
| partner = 
| children = 
| relatives = 
| signature = 
| notableworks = The Summer PrinceThe Spirit Binders'
| website = 
| education = Columbia University (BA)
}}
Alaya Dawn Johnson (born 1982) is an American writer of speculative fiction.

Career
Apart from short fiction, Johnson has published two urban fantasy novels about "vampire suffragette" Zephyr Hollis set in an alternate 1920s New York City, and two novels set on islands resembling pre-modern Polynesia where people have learned to bind elemental powers to their commands.

Her 2013 debut in the young adult fiction sector, the standalone novel The Summer Prince, is set on a post-apocalyptic cyberpunk Brazilian arcology ruled by a nanotech-empowered matriarchy. Love Is the Drug, her 2014 stand-alone young adult novel, is set in Washington, D.C. and follows a prep-school student whose memory loss may be connected to a burgeoning global influenza pandemic.

In February 2021 Johnson was the literary guest of honor and keynote speaker at the 39th annual Life, the Universe, & Everything professional science fiction and fantasy arts symposium.

Personal life
Johnson was born in Washington, D.C. She graduated from Columbia University in 2004 with a Bachelor of Arts in East Asian Languages and Cultures. Johnson lived in New York City until 2014, when she moved to Mexico City.

Awards and honors
World Fantasy Awards Winner, Best Novel for Trouble the Saints, 2021
Andre Norton Award Winner, Best Young Adult Novel for Love Is the Drug, 2015
Nebula Award Winner, Best Novelette for A Guide to the Fruits of Hawai’i, 2015
Nebula Award Nominee, Best Novelette for They Shall Salt the Earth with Seeds of Glass, 2013
Andre Norton Award Nominee for Young Adult Science Fiction and Fantasy for The Summer Prince, 2013
National Book Award Longlist, Young People's Literature for The Summer Prince, 2013
GLBTRT Top Ten Rainbow List for The Summer Prince, 2014
Junior Library Guild selection for The Summer Prince, Spring 2013
YALSA nominee for their BFYA list for The Summer Prince, 2013
Finalist for the 2011 Carl Brandon Society Parallax award for the novel MoonshineFinalist for the 2011 Carl Brandon Society Kindred award for the novel The Burning CityTop Ten finalist for the 2010 Million Writers Award for the short story A Song to Greet the SunWinner of the 2008 Gulliver Travel Grant from the Speculative Literature Foundation
Finalist for the 2006 Carl Brandon Society Parallax award for the short story Shard of GlassBibliography

Novels
 
 
 The Spirit Binders seriesZephyr Hollis'' series

 Quick story, published in ebook and webzine format.

Collection 

  Includes 10 short stories:
 "A Guide to the Fruits of Hawai’i"
 "Their Changing Bodies"
 "They Shall Salt the Earth with Seeds of Glass"
 "Down the Well"
 "Third Day Lights"
 "The Score"
 "Far and Deep"
 "The Mirages"
 "Reconstruction"
 "A Song to Greet the Sun"

Short fiction

References

External links

1982 births
Living people
21st-century American novelists
21st-century American women writers
American fantasy writers
American science fiction writers
American women novelists
American writers of young adult literature
Asimov's Science Fiction people
Columbia College (New York) alumni
Women science fiction and fantasy writers
Women writers of young adult literature
Writers from Washington, D.C.
African-American novelists
Afrofuturist writers
21st-century African-American women writers
21st-century African-American writers
20th-century African-American people
20th-century African-American women
Nebula Award winners